Samuel Little (born Samuel McDowell; June 7, 1940 – December 30, 2020) was an American serial killer who confessed to murdering 93 women between 1970 and 2005. In 2014 he was convicted of the murders of Linda Alford, Guadalupe Duarte Apodaca, and Audrey Nelson Everett, and in 2018 for the murder of Denise Christie Brothers as well as several others in 2019. The Federal Bureau of Investigation (FBI)'s Violent Criminal Apprehension Program (ViCAP) has confirmed Little's involvement in at least 60 of the 93 confessed murders, the largest number of confirmed victims for any serial killer in United States history.

Early life
Samuel Little was born as Samuel McDowell on June 7, 1940, in Reynolds, Georgia. Little claimed that his mother, Bessie Mae Little, was a teenage prostitute who had abandoned him; authorities believe that she might have given birth to him while she was in jail. The census from the year Little was born said Bessie Mae worked as a maid and that his father was 19-year-old Paul McDowell. Soon after his birth, Little's family moved to Lorain, Ohio, where he was brought up mainly by his grandmother. He attended Hawthorne Junior High School, where he had problems with discipline and achievement. By his own account, he began having sexual fantasies about strangling women as a child, starting when he saw his kindergarten teacher touch her neck; as a teenager, he collected true crime magazines depicting women being choked.

In 1956, after being convicted of breaking and entering into property in Omaha, Nebraska, Little was held in an institution for juvenile offenders. His mother was listed on the booking card as "whereabouts unknown." Little moved to Florida to live with his mother in the late 1960s, and by his own account he was working at various times as a cemetery worker and an ambulance attendant. He said he then "began traveling more widely and had more run-ins with the law", being arrested in eight states for crimes that included driving under the influence, fraud, shoplifting, solicitation, armed robbery, aggravated assault, and rape. Little claimed that he took up boxing during his time in prison, referring to himself as a former prizefighter.

Crimes 
In 1961, Little was sentenced to three years in prison for breaking into a furniture store in Lorain; he was released in 1964. By 1975, he had been arrested 26 times in eleven states for crimes including theft, assault, attempted rape, fraud, and attacks on government officials. 

In 1982, Little was arrested in Pascagoula, Mississippi, and charged with the murder of 22-year-old Melinda Rose LáPree, who had gone missing in September of that year. A grand jury declined to indict him for her murder. However, while under investigation, Little was extradited to Florida and tried for the murder of 26-year-old Patricia Ann Mount, whose body was found in September 1982. Prosecution witnesses identified Little in court as a person who spent time with Mount on the night before her disappearance. Due to mistrust of witness testimonies, Little was acquitted in January 1984.

Little moved to California, where he stayed in the vicinity of San Diego. In October 1984, he was arrested for kidnapping, beating, and strangling 22-year-old Laurie Barros, who survived. One month later, he was found by police in the back seat of his car with an unconscious woman, also beaten and strangled, in the same location as the attempted murder of Barros. Little served two and a half years in prison for both crimes. Upon his release in February 1987, he immediately moved to Los Angeles and committed at least ten additional murders.

Little was arrested on September 5, 2012, at a homeless shelter in Louisville, Kentucky, and extradited to California to face a narcotics charge, after which authorities used DNA testing to establish that he was involved in the murders of Linda Alford, killed on July 13, 1987; Guadalupe Duarte Apodaca, killed on September 3, 1987; and Audrey Nelson Everett, killed on August 14, 1989. All three women were killed and later found on the streets of Los Angeles. He was extradited to Los Angeles, where he was charged on January 7, 2013. A few months later, the police said that Little was being investigated for involvement in three dozen murders committed in the 1980s, which until then had been undisclosed. In connection with the new circumstances in Mississippi, the LaPree murder case was reopened. In total, Little was tested for involvement in 93 murders of women committed in many U.S. states.

Trial and incarceration 
Little was tried for the murders of Alford, Nelson, and Apodaca in September 2014. The prosecution presented the DNA evidence as well as testimony of witnesses who were attacked by the accused at different times throughout his criminal career. On September 25, 2014, Little was found guilty and was sentenced to life imprisonment without possibility of parole. On the day of the verdict, Little continued to insist on his innocence. Before his death, Little was serving a sentence at the California State Prison, Los Angeles County.

Later confessions 
On November 9, 2018, Little confessed to the 1996 fatal strangulation of Melissa Thomas. On November 13, 2018, Little was charged with the 1994 murder of Denise Christie Brothers in Odessa, Texas after having confessed the crime to a Texas Ranger in May 2018. Little pleaded guilty to the murder of Brothers on December 13 and received another life sentence. The Ector County, Texas District Attorney and Wise County, Texas Sheriff's Office announced on November 13 that Little had confessed to dozens of murders and may have committed more than 90 across 14 states between 1970 and 2005.

On November 15, 2018, the Russell County, Alabama District Attorney announced that Little had earlier that month confessed to the 1979 murder of 23-year-old Brenda Alexander, whose body was found in Phenix City, Alabama. On November 16, 2018, Macon, Georgia sheriffs announced that Little had credibly confessed to the 1977 strangling murder of an unidentified woman and the 1982 strangling murder of 18-year-old Fredonia Smith. In the fall of 2018, Little confessed to the 1982 murder of 55-year-old Dorothy Richards and the 1996 murder of 40-year-old Daisy McGuire; both of their bodies were found in Houma, Louisiana.

On November 19, 2018, Harrison County, Mississippi sheriff Troy Peterson said that Little had confessed to strangling 36-year-old Julia Critchfield in the Gulfport area in 1978 and dumping her body off a cliff. On November 20, 2018, Lee County, Mississippi law enforcement officials announced that Little had admitted to killing 46-year-old Nancy Carol Stevens in Tupelo, Mississippi in 2005 and that the case would be presented to a grand jury in January 2019. On November 21, 2018, Richland County, South Carolina authorities announced that Little had confessed to murdering 19-year-old Evelyn Weston, whose body was found near Fort Jackson, South Carolina in 1978. Little confessed to having killed 20-year-old Rosie Hill in Marion County, Florida in 1982.

On November 27, 2018, the Federal Bureau of Investigation (FBI) announced that a Violent Criminal Apprehension Program team had confirmed 34 of Little's confessions and was working to match the remainder of Little's confessions to known murders or suspicious deaths. Little began making the confessions in exchange for a transfer out of the Los Angeles County prison in which he was being held. One included his confession to a previous cold case homicide in Prince George's County, Maryland, previously one of only two homicide cases in that county with unidentified victims.

In December 2018, Little was indicted for strangling Linda Sue Boards, 23, to death in May 1981 in Warren County, Kentucky. Her body was found on May 15, 1981, near U.S. Route 68. One of Little's victims was identified in December 2018 as Martha Cunningham of Knox County, Tennessee, who was 34-years-old when Little murdered her in 1975.

On May 31, 2019, Cuyahoga County, Ohio prosecutors announced indictments, with four counts of aggravated murder and six counts of kidnapping, that accuse Little of killing Mary Jo Peyton in 1984 and Rose Evans in 1991 in Cleveland. Both victims were strangled and dumped. The body of Rose Evans, 32, was found on August 24, 1991, in a vacant lot on East 39th St. She left her hometown of Binghamton, New York when she was 17. Evans had been strangled, according to coroner Elizabeth K. Balraj. As for Peyton, an anthropologist had to create a model of what she looked like, but she remained unidentified until 1992 when Cleveland put her thumbprint in an FBI data base and got a match. Little picked up Peyton at a bar near East 105th and Euclid avenues. He described her as a short, plump woman in her 20s with brown hair. Little confessed to killing another Cleveland woman in 1977 or 1978. The woman murdered in 1977 or 1978 was found on March 18, 1983, in Willoughby Hills, Ohio according to the National Missing and Unidentified Persons System. She was likely black and somewhere between 17- and 35-years-old. The woman's body had been dumped down a grassy slope, near a fence in a wooded area just off Interstate 271; when her body was found by a man walking his dog, only her skeleton, some clothing, and jewelry remained.

Little confessed to killing one woman in Akron, Ohio; two in Cincinnatione of the bodies was dumped outside of Columbus, Ohio; and one woman he met in Columbus and disposed of in Kentucky. Of the two women Little murdered in Cincinnati, one was identified as Anna Stewart, 33, whose body was dumped in Grove City, Ohio. Stewart was last seen on October 6, 1981, getting out of a cab at General Hospital to see her sister in the hospital (now University of Cincinnati Academic Health Center). She was killed on October 11. He killed the other woman between 1980 and 1999. The "Jane Doe" was anywhere from 15 to 50 as the details of her age and the date of her murder are unclear. She was black, slender, wore glasses and lived in the Over-the-Rhine neighborhood of Cincinnati with a "heavy female Hispanic." Little left her beside a cigarette billboard in Ohio. On June 7, 2019, Little was indicted in Hamilton County, Ohio for murdering the two women killed in Cincinnati.

Little had drawn portraits of many women he killed. These portraits were released by the FBI in hopes of someone identifying the women. At least one portrait solved a cold case in Akron, Ohio.

In November 2020, Little confessed to two Florida murders, for one of which another man had been wrongfully convicted. On April 22, 2022, a woman Little killed in Memphis, Tennessee, whose body was found on the Arkansas side of the Mississippi River, in 1990 was identified as 30-year-old Zena Marie Jones.

Confirmed murder victims 
Little admitted to more than 93 different murders in total, and 60 deaths have been formally connected to him by the police. The majority of Little's victims were prostitutes, drug addicts, or homeless individuals, and most of them were female. He claimed that he thought these persons would leave fewer clues for authorities to find and leave fewer persons to search for them. However, despite the scope of his offending, in total he was only charged and convicted for eight murders:
 Annie Lee Stewart, 32, was murdered on October 11, 1981, in Cincinnati, Ohio. Little strangled her and disposed of her body in the woods behind some apartments off Queen Anne Place in Grove City. Little was convicted of her murder on August 23, 2019.
 Mary Jo Peyton, 21, was murdered sometime in 1984 after she encountered Little at a bar in Cleveland, Ohio. Little claimed that he and Peyton left a bar together and that he then took her to an abandoned factory. He choked her there before throwing her lifeless body down a basement staircase. Two workers from a nearby company discovered her dead on July 3, 1984, a few weeks later. Little was convicted of the murder on August 23, 2019.
 Carol Linda Alford, 41, was murdered by Little in Los Angeles, California. Authorities discovered Little's first DNA match on her underwear and under her fingernails. On July 13, 1987, her body was discovered in a Los Angeles alley. From the waist down, she was nude. Her daughter recognised her body. She had been forcefully strangled to death, an autopsy indicated. She also experienced other wounds, such as a punch-related head injury from blunt force. Little was found guilty of the crime on September 25, 2014.
 Guadalupe Apodaca, 46, was found on September 3, 1989 at an abandoned auto repair shop in Los Angeles, California, after a boy kicking a soccer ball against the building peered into the windows and saw her lifeless body. Authorities determined that Little kneeled on her chest and strangled her with his hands, causing her to have a seizure. She was nude from the waist down and had blood in her anal cavity as well. DNA linked Little to the crime, and he was convicted on September 25, 2014.
 Audrey Nelson Everett, 35, was found in a dumpster behind a night club and restaurant in Los Angeles, California, on August 14, 1989. There was nothing found that could be used to identify her body, which was naked from the waist down. She had been repeatedly hit in the head before being forcefully strangled, according to an autopsy. Additionally, she had "road burns" that suggested she had been pulled on a hard surface, most likely before she passed away, as well as a smashed spinal bone, bruises on her belly that were also suggestive of punching, and injuries on her back. According to coroner Dr. Eugene Carpenter's testimony, the woman had serious injuries from strangulation and a stomach injury that showed "a sign of considerable force." He continued, "these signs of force are the greatest that I have seen in a 27-year practice in a county which has its share of strangulation cases." DNA under her fingernails linked Little to the crime, and he was convicted on September 25, 2014.
 Zena Marie Jones, 30, was a woman found murdered in West Memphis, Arkansas on July 28, 1990, after going missing on July 6 from Memphis, Tennessee. On the Arkansas side of the Mississippi River, close to the shore, and about eight feet from the river's mile marker 722.2, a fisherman discovered the victim. Little admitted to killing her and provided a sketch in 2018. He claimed she was a prostitute who was between the ages of 28 and 29 and that he had picked her up at a Memphis, Tennessee, motel. As a Memphis Police car passed them, he choked her while they were in his car. The victim was then dropped into the river once he entered Arkansas and pulled up to a bridge. On August 23, 2019, he was found guilty of her homicide. She was identified in April 2022, after her family noticed a resemblance between the composite sketch drawn by Little and Jones.
 Rose Evans, 32, was murdered in Cleveland, Ohio on or around August 24, 1991. Little encountered Evans while driving and offered her a ride. Then, in an abandoned area, he strangled her in his car before dumping her body in a lot and covering it with two tyres. He was convicted of her murder on August 23, 2019.
 Denise Christie Brothers, 32, was a mother of two who was found killed in Odessa, Texas on February 2, 1994. Brothers had been reported missing on January 1, 1994. According to District Attorney Bobby Bland, she had been strangled. Little pleaded guilty to killing her, receiving his fourth life sentence for it on December 13, 2018.

Suspected murder victims 
According to the FBI, Little confessed to the murders of the following individuals. He provided sketches for twenty-six of them. Not all of these individuals have been confirmed to be linked to specific, known murders, unless noted.

Unmatched confessions 
Samuel Little claimed to have strangled more than 93 people between 1970 and 2005, though many of his victims' deaths were first ruled as accidental or overdoses. Many of Little's victims' bodies were never found, and the confessions he provided along with a sketch could not be matched to a known missing person.

Miami, Florida (1971 or 1972): Little confessed to strangling an 18 or 19-year-old black transgender woman in 1971 or 1972, and leaving her body in the Everglades near Highway 27. Little remembered her name as Marianne or Mary Ann. She was between 5'6 and 5'7, weighing about 140 pounds. Little did not believe her body was ever found. Little sketched this victim during one of his confessions in 2019.

Little Rock, Arkansas (1992 or 1994): Little confessed to strangling a 24-year-old black female in 1992 or 1994. She was between 5'5 and 5'7, weighing about 200 pounds. Little recalled he stayed with her for about three days as they shoplifted together, and that her name may have been Ruth. Little was arrested for shoplifting from Kroger by the Little Rock police on April 20, 1994. Little said that after killing her he placed her body on a pile of branches near a cornfield. Little sketched this victim during one of his confessions in 2019.

Covington, Kentucky (1984): Little confessed to strangling a 25-year-old white female outside of a strip club in 1984. Little remembered she had short blonde hair, blue eyes, and a "hippie" appearance. She was 5'6-5'7 and weighed between 130-170 pounds. He drove the woman south on Interstate 75 toward Miami, Florida before driving into a hilly area near the highway. After killing her in the backseat of his car, he left her body on the top of a small hill. Little sketched this victim during one of his confessions in 2019.In December 2022 "Jane Doe" who was killed in May 1988 was Identified as "Linda Bennett" age 38

Las Vegas, Nevada (1993): Little confessed to strangling a thin, black female around 40 years old in 1993. She was about 5'5 and weighed 110-120 pounds. Little recalled she may have worn a wig over short hair. After killing her in a hotel room, he drove her body to the outskirts of Las Vegas and rolled her body down a steep slope. Little sketched this victim during one of his confessions in 2019.

Los Angeles, California (1996): Little confessed to strangling a thin, white female in 1996. She was about 5' and weighed 110 pounds. After killing her in the bathroom of a vacant house, he undressed her below the waist and unsuccessfully attempted to perform postmortem anal sex before sitting her body up in the bathtub and leaving.

Los Angeles, California (1984): Little confessed to strangling a short, thick, black female in 1984. After killing her, he had sex with her body on a service road off of the I-10 before dragging her halfway up a hill and leaving her there.

Personal life and death 
Little had a long-term girlfriend, Orelia “Jean” Dorsey, since deceased, who supported them both through shoplifting for years. On May 28, 1971, he was arrested in Cleveland with his girlfriend at the time, Lucy Madero, and they were charged with robbery of a gas station. While in jail Madero confided in her cellmate, Dorsey, that she would be testifying against Little in the subsequent robbery case. In 1972, when the case went to trial, Madero did in fact testify against Little, but his defense team was able to plan for it with help from information passed on by Dorsey. Little was eventually found not guilty. Dorsey and Little were together until she died of natural causes, a brain haemorrhage, in Los Angeles in 1988. She was 27 years older than Little.

Little died on December 30, 2020, in a Los Angeles County area hospital. Although California Department of Corrections and Rehabilitation sources indicate no cause of death, Little suffered from diabetes, heart problems, and other health conditions.

Media 
Confronting a Serial Killer is an American documentary television miniseries, directed and produced by Joe Berlinger, showing Jillian Lauren investigating Little. Consisting of five episodes, it premiered on April 18, 2021, on Starz.

See also 

 List of serial killers by number of victims
 List of serial killers in the United States

References

External links

 

1940 births
2020 deaths
20th-century African-American people
20th-century American criminals
African-American people
American male criminals
American people convicted of murder
American people convicted of rape
American people convicted of robbery
American people convicted of theft
American rapists
American serial killers
Crimes against sex workers in the United States
Criminals from Los Angeles
Male serial killers
Necrophiles
People convicted of murder by California
People convicted of murder by Ohio
People convicted of murder by Texas
People from Taylor County, Georgia
Prisoners sentenced to life imprisonment by United States jurisdictions
Serial killers who died in prison custody
Violence against women in the United States